Fulda is a city in Hesse, Germany.

Fulda may also refer to:

In Germany 
 Fulda (river), a tributary of the Weser
 Fulda (district), in the state of Hesse
 Fulda Gap, an area in central Germany that assumed strategic importance during the Cold War
 Fulda station
 Fulda Symphonic Orchestra
 Fulda Tires, the German division of Goodyear
 University of Fulda
 Fulda University of Applied Sciences
 Borussia Fulda, a football (soccer) club
 Roman Catholic Diocese of Fulda
 Treaty of Fulda, signed in 1813
 Fulda Cathedral
 Fulda monastery

Other places 
 Fulda, Indiana, United States
 Fulda, Minnesota, United States
 Fulda, Ohio, United States
 Fulda, Washington, United States, a former community

People 
 Adam of Fulda (1445–1505), German Renaissance composer
 Anne Fulda (born 1963), French journalist
 Ludwig Fulda (1862–1939), German writer
 Wilhelm Fulda (1909–1977), German Luftwaffe officer

Biology
 Fulda (skipper), a genus of butterflies

See also 
 Fuldamobil, a series of small cars produced by Elektromaschinenbau Fulda GmbH